Juti Ravenna (December 26, 1897 – April 29, 1972) was an Italian painter.

Biography 
Ravenna's artistic life began in 1914, with the making of some drawings. During World War I, he was at battlefront and produced some sketches, then collected and published in the autobiography  "Una vita per la pittura". Thanks to a visit to  Florence, during a permit, he came in contact with artistic environment and in particular with works by  Ardengo Soffici which showed him the Impressionism painting. Since 1920 he moved to Venice and attended the “Accademia di Belle Arti”. He began showing  in 1921, and met Gino Rossi, Enrico Fonda e Pio Semeghini who became one of his good friends and who made three different portraits of his. He began painting  in Burano together with painter Seibezzi. In 1924 Nino Barbantini set up a personal exhibit of Ravenna in the ”Opera Bevilacqua La Masa show” in Ca' Pesaro.

Then he showed in the Ca' Pesaro exhibits, in the quadrennial exhibits and in the most important exhibits in Italy and abroad, also winning several prices. He also showed at Venice Biennale in 1928, 1930, 1932, 1934, 1948, 1950 and 1972.

"Mr Ravenna tendency in that moment was close to Venetian post-impressionism.” 

During his job Ravenna constantly contributed to several magazines with texts and designs. Also he helped the Italian editorial renewal and looked after the printing of some books. With the help of  Egidio Bonfante in 1943, he published the book 50 disegni di Picasso, and the book Arte Cubista, two years later.

Ravenna has always been suggested by the Venetian lagoon background and in particular by Treviso lands. So in 1948 he left Venice  (the attic in Palazzo Carminati) and moved to Treviso, town he loved, where a lot of friends of his in the cultural environment were living (Giovanni Comisso, Sante Cancian – died in 1947 -, Toni Perolo, Nevra Garatti); in Treviso he married Cancian widow and son Luciano was born.

In 1951 he won (together with Virgilio Guidi) the Premio Burano.

Later he got several rewards in Italy, for instance the privilege of “Commendatore della Repubblica” and the appellation “Accademico Benemerito” by the Accademia Universitaria G. Marconi in  Roma thanks to the figurative art activity.

On 29 April 1972, Ravenna died at Treviso Hospital.

Notes

Bibliography 
 
 
 
 
 
 
 
 
 
 
 
 
 
 
 
 
 
 
 
 
 
 
 
 
 
 
 
 
 
 
 
 
 
 

1897 births
1972 deaths
20th-century Italian painters
Italian male painters
Post-impressionist painters
Accademia di Belle Arti di Venezia alumni
20th-century Italian male artists